"Boyfriend" is a song by American singer Dove Cameron, it was released on February 11, 2022, via Disruptor Records and Columbia Records as the lead single from her upcoming debut studio album Celestial Body. The song was written by Cameron, Delacey, Evan Blair and Skyler Stonestreet, and produced by Evan Blair.

Background
Cameron posted a video containing a portion of the song on TikTok that gained over 4.7 million likes. Although the song was not intended to be released in February, when it went viral, she later announced on Instagram that the song would be released on February 11, 2022.

Content
An electropop and power pop anthem, "Boyfriend" references Cameron's sexuality after she came out as queer in 2021, and explicitly describes a romantic relationship with a woman. Melody Heald of Glitter Magazine wrote that the song "hints that her love interest needs a girlfriend, thinking she would treat her better than her boyfriend" by "doing things he'd never do". Cameron said in a press release: "In writing 'Boyfriend,' I feel like I finally found my sound, my perspective, and myself in a way I wasn't sure I ever would. I am so immensely happy to have this song and this part of me out in the world".

Critical reception
Isabella Vega of Euphoria Magazine commented that  "Boyfriend" will become a big hit due to "its killer lyricism, or even its almost gothic production, but with its deeply embedded message of self-empowerment". Caitlin White of Uproxx described the song as "dramatic and dark, and hits like a queer James Bond anthem".

Credits and personnel
Credits adapted from Tidal.

 Evan Blair – producer, composer, lyricist, recording engineer
 Delacey – composer, lyricist
 Dove Cameron – composer, lyricist, associated performer
 Skyler Stonestreet – composer, lyricist
 Eric Legg – mastering engineer
 Alex Ghenea – mixing engineer

Charts

Weekly charts

Year-end charts

Certifications

Release history

References

2022 songs
2022 singles
Dove Cameron songs
Disruptor Records singles
Columbia Records singles
Songs written by Dove Cameron
Songs written by Skyler Stonestreet
LGBT-related songs
Bisexuality-related songs